Workplace is an online collaborative software tool developed by Meta Platforms. It facilitates online groupwork, instant messaging, video conferencing, and news sharing.

History
Workplace was first announced on January 14, 2015. It launched in beta as Facebook at Work before officially launching in October 2016. Free accounts were discontinued in February 2021.

Workplace and Facebook 

While Workplace accounts are set up and run separately from Facebook accounts, Workplace uses much of the underlying technology that powers Facebook.

Workplace data is stored across 12 Facebook-owned and operated data centers.

Workplace uses machine learning to rank information in a user's news feed and make recommendations, while 'downranking' less relevant information.

In October 2018, Workplace announced the launch of Safety Check. Originally developed by Facebook engineers after the 2011 Japanese tsunami, Safety Check for Workplace allows organizations to identify employees who may be affected by a crisis and send and monitor responses. Safety Check has been used by Delta Air Lines (during Hurricane Florence and the Hokkaido earthquake).

Reception
Workplace has an aggregated rating of 4 stars from 1,379 reviews on G2, and an aggregated rating of 4 stars from 103 reviews on Gartner Peer Insights. It has been praised as a tool for internal communication and collaboration, but critics have noted that it lacks some project management functionality.

Customers
Workplace is used by over 30,000 organizations. As of May 2021, there are 7 million paying users, but the total number of users, both paid and unpaid, hasn't been disclosed.

Workplace for Good
Workplace for Good was launched in June 2018 to provide a free version of Workplace for registered non-profits and staff of educational institutions.

Integrations
Integrations are available with popular SaaS tools like Jira, SharePoint, ServiceNow, Adobe Sign, SurveyMonkey, Google Drive, Zoom and Dropbox.

See also
 Social project management
 Collaboration software
 List of collaborative software
 Social graph
 Meta Platforms

References

External links
 

Business software
Collaborative software
Groupware
Meta Platforms applications